Anthony Michael Harris (born August 30, 1966) is a former American football center and guard who played for the Kansas City Chiefs of the National Football League (NFL). He played college football at Grambling State University.

References

Living people
1966 births
Grambling State Tigers football players
Kansas City Chiefs players
Players of American football from Louisiana